Henry Jackson (born 25 October 1947) is a Jamaican athlete. He competed in the men's long jump and the men's triple jump at the 1972 Summer Olympics.

References

1947 births
Living people
Athletes (track and field) at the 1970 British Commonwealth Games
Athletes (track and field) at the 1972 Summer Olympics
Athletes (track and field) at the 1975 Pan American Games
Jamaican male long jumpers
Jamaican male triple jumpers
Olympic athletes of Jamaica
Place of birth missing (living people)
Commonwealth Games competitors for Jamaica
Pan American Games competitors for Jamaica
20th-century Jamaican people
21st-century Jamaican people